Rebecca Riggs is an Australian actress best known for her role as Commandant Grayza in the science fiction television series Farscape.

Career

Television

Riggs play the recurring role of Commandant Grayza in the TV show Farscape.

She has also appeared in many Australian television series including Backberner, All Saints, Day of the Roses, Medivac and Fire.

Theater

She has appeared as a stage performer in Australia with such companies as Bell Shakespeare Company, Queensland Theatre Company, Darwin Theatre Company, La Boite and TN. She has undertaken roles which range from the classics: Juliet and Lady Capulet in two different productions of Romeo and Juliet, Lady Macbeth in Macbeth, Trinculo in The Tempest, Bianca in Othello, Viola in Twelfth Night and Kate in the Taming of the Shrew... to modern Australian plays including the musicals Summer Rain and an acclaimed performance as Judy Garland in Boy from Oz.

She has performed a one woman/fifteen character show The Tall Green Stranger in the Ceramic Pot, and also cabarets at the L.A. Creation Conventions in 2009 and 2011: The Shower Show (2009) and Witch Way? (2011).

She has performed with many improvisational troupes throughout Australia and has sung with bands, choirs and a cappella groups such as Darc Marc, The Lutin Girls Choir, The Star Pickets, Schrödinger's Cats, and many more.

Movies

Riggs had parts in such movies as Jerry Maguire and Raw Nerve.

Personal life

She is also now committed to refining communication in disaster and crisis through her work with consultancy Crisis Ready and the not for profit organization Emergency Media and Public Affairs. She is a fan of the Sci Fi genre.

References

External links
 

Australian television actresses
Living people
People from Queensland
Year of birth missing (living people)